Avacha may refer to:
Avacha Bay, Kamchatka Peninsula, Russia
Avacha (river), Kamchatka Peninsula, Russia 
Avacha Volcano, Kamchatka Peninsula, Russia, also called Avachinsky